Two Wives One Wedding is a low budget 1961 British crime film directed by Montgomery Tully and starring Gordon Jackson, Christina Gregg, and Lisa Daniely.

Plot
Tom Murray's wedding day becomes a nightmare when a mysterious stranger turns up claiming to be his wife. Annette is a French woman who had an affair with Tom during the Second World War, when he was injured near Normandy and she nursed him back to health. She claims that Tom became her husband then, but he has no memory of it. Annette is willing to divorce Tom, but only with a settlement of 10,000 ponds. Blackmailed and with his promising medical career in the balance if the story reaches the press, Tom turns detective to determine if Annette is telling the truth.

Cast

Recent assessments
TV Guide writes that "an intriguing premise suffers from some unbelievable plot twists and turns". 

According to moviereviewsandnews.com, the film is "lifted above the mundane by an earnest performance by Gordon Jackson and a decent supporting cast. It's a little too obvious and too reliant on coincidence, though, and the final scenes lack both credibility and emotional resonance."

References

External links

1961 films
Films directed by Montgomery Tully
British crime drama films
Films shot at New Elstree Studios
1960s English-language films
1960s British films